Sydney Development Corporation ("SDC"), was the first publicly-traded software company in Canada. Founded by Tarrnie Williams, SDC developed an online real-time project management system for the IBM System z mainframe computer, then various different business applications for microcomputers such as the Apple II, and eventually became the first developer and publisher of computer games for microcomputers in Canada.

In 1981, SDC agreed to publish Evolution by Don Mattrick and Jeff Sembers, after Williams's 10-year-old son enjoyed a demo of the game. Evolution sold over 400,000 copies, and Mattrick and Sembers went on to found Distinctive Software.

Sydney Development Corp. was the fastest-growing public company in Canada in the five-year period 1978 to 1983 with fiscal year 1983 revenues of Can$21 million (equivalent to $ in ).

The company filed for bankruptcy on 23 May 1989.

References

1978 establishments in British Columbia
Software companies of Canada